The Kŭmya Line is an electrified standard-gauge secondary line of the Korean State Railway in South P'yŏngan Province, North Korea, running from Kŭmya on the P'yŏngra Line to P'ungnam.

History
This line was opened by the Korean State Railway in the 1970s.

Route
A yellow background in the "Distance" box indicates that section of the line is not electrified.

References

Railway lines in North Korea
Standard gauge railways in North Korea